Puthige  is a village in the southern state of Karnataka, India. It is located in the Mangalore taluk of Dakshina Kannada district.

Demographics
 India census, Puthige had a population of 7535 with 3608 males and 3927 females.

Prominent people from Puthige
Abdussalam Puthige, s the Editor-in-Chief of Varthabharathi

See also
 Mangalore
 Dakshina Kannada
 Districts of Karnataka

References

External links
 http://dk.nic.in/

Villages in Dakshina Kannada district
Localities in Mangalore